Mark T. Simerly is a United States Army major general who serves as the commanding general of the United States Army Combined Arms Support Command, United States Army Sustainment Center of Excellence and Fort Lee since July 9, 2021. He previously served as the Director of Logistics of the United States Forces Korea and Deputy Director of Logistics of the United Nations Command and ROK/US Combined Forces Command and, prior to that, as the Commanding General of the 19th Expeditionary Sustainment Command.

References

Living people
Place of birth missing (living people)
Recipients of the Defense Superior Service Medal
Recipients of the Legion of Merit
United States Army generals
United States Army personnel of the Iraq War
United States Army personnel of the War in Afghanistan (2001–2021)
Year of birth missing (living people)